Sørskogbygda Church is a parish church of the Church of Norway in Elverum Municipality in Innlandet county, Norway. It is located in the village of Sørskogbygda. It is the church for the Sørskogbygda parish which is part of the Sør-Østerdal prosti (deanery) in the Diocese of Hamar. The white, wooden church was built in a long church design in 1873 using plans drawn up by the architect Otto Schønheyder. The church seats about 400 people.

History

In 1869, it was decided to build an annex chapel in Sørskogbygda, southeast of the town of Elverum. (Another chapel at Nordskogbygda was built at the same time by the same architect. Identical buildings except this one was larger.) The church was designed by Otto Schønheyder and it was built by a group of local carpenters. The style is often described as late Art Nouveau, but the windows and entrance are otherwise very reminiscent of Swiss chalet style. The church was built and consecrated in 1873.

See also
List of churches in Hamar

References

Elverum
Churches in Innlandet
Long churches in Norway
Wooden churches in Norway
19th-century Church of Norway church buildings
Churches completed in 1873
1873 establishments in Norway